Hidden Ivies is a college educational guide with the most recent edition, The Hidden Ivies, 3rd Edition: 63 of America's Top Liberal Arts Colleges and Universities, published in 2016, by Howard and Matthew Greene.

Overview
Howard and Matthew Greene's Hidden Ivies focuses on college admissions in the United States. According to Union College, "the authors contend that students who attend one of the 'Hidden Ivies' are likely to acquire critical skills or instincts, including cooperation, leadership, collaboration, mentoring, appreciating personal, religious and cultural differences, and 'learning the truth that intelligence without character, personal integrity and a working set of values can be a dangerous thing.'"

The authors define both the title of this book as well as their goals in writing it as: "to create greater awareness of the small, distinctive cluster of colleges and universities of excellence that are available to gifted college-bound students." In the introduction, the authors further explain their aim by referring specifically to "the group historically known as the 'Little Ivies' (including Amherst, Bowdoin, Middlebury, Swarthmore, Wesleyan, and Williams)" which the authors say have "scaled the heights of prestige and selectivity and also turn away thousands of our best and brightest young men and women."

Inclusions

Northeast

Amherst College
Barnard College
Bates College
Boston College
Bowdoin College
Brandeis University
Bryn Mawr College
Bucknell University
Colby College
Colgate University
College of the Holy Cross
Connecticut College
Dickinson College
Fordham University
Franklin & Marshall College
Hamilton College
Haverford College
Johns Hopkins University
Lafayette College
Lehigh University
Middlebury College
Mount Holyoke College
Skidmore College
Smith College
Swarthmore College
Trinity College
Tufts University
Union College
University of Rochester
Vassar College
Villanova University
Wellesley College
Wesleyan University
Williams College

South

Davidson College
Duke University
Emory University
Georgetown University
Rice University
Sewanee: The University of the South
Southern Methodist University
Tulane University
University of Richmond
Vanderbilt University
Wake Forest University
Washington and Lee University

Midwest

Carleton College
Case Western Reserve University
Denison University
Grinnell College
Kenyon College
Macalester College
Northwestern University
Oberlin College
University of Chicago
University of Notre Dame
Washington University in St. Louis

West

Claremont McKenna College
Colorado College
Pomona College
Reed College
Stanford University
University of Southern California

See also
 Black Ivy League—A list of historically black colleges or universities that provide Ivy quality education in a predominantly black environment
 Public Ivies—Group of public US universities thought to "provide an Ivy League collegiate experience at a public school price"
 Southern Ivies—Complimentary use of "Ivy" to characterize excellent universities in the US South
 Little Ivies—An unofficial group of small, academically competitive private liberal arts colleges in the Northeastern United States.
 Jesuit Ivy—Use of "Ivy" to characterize Boston College and other prominent American Jesuit colleges
 Seven Sisters (colleges)—Seven highly selective liberal arts colleges in the Northeastern United States that are historically women's colleges, intended as the educational equivalent to the (traditionally male) Ivy League colleges

References

Footnotes

Bibliography

External links

Universities and colleges in the United States
Books about education
University and college admissions
.
2000 non-fiction books
2009 non-fiction books
2016 non-fiction books